Shooting to wound refers to attempts to use a firearm to harm someone without killing them. It is controversial since the unpredictable nature of firearm wounds could result in the wound failing to incapacitate the target; it may accidentally kill or miss the target, the latter presents a risk of unintended casualties.  Limbs are one main area often targeted when shooting to wound. However, limbs are smaller and can be moved faster and more radically than the torso, so the option of shooting to wound is generally viewed with skepticism by law enforcement in the United States. 

There are numerous variables when determining how severe a gunshot wound is, such as the bullet's size, velocity, and trajectory; the type of firearm is also essential in the examination. The severity is also dependent on the location of the wound; individuals who suffer gunshot wounds require specific medical procedures to reduce the likelihood of death, permanent disability, or other complications; they also require immediate medical services. Even if the victim survives, they may have a permanent disability, trauma, or lifelong damage as a result of the wound.

See also
 Warning shot
 Non-lethal weapon

References

Firearms